"Anywhere in the World" is a collaborative single by English DJ, guitarist, music producer, artist Mark Ronson and English singer-songwriter Katy B. It was recorded as part of Coca-Cola's Move to the Beat promotional campaign for the 2012 Summer Olympics in London. The single was released as a digital download on 30 March 2012 in Belgium and it was released in the UK on 13 May 2012.

Background
Ronson used recorded snippets of the athletes—Mexican Taekwondo athlete Maria del Rosario Espinoza muffled punches, Russian runner Kseniya Olegovna Vdovina's heartbeat—in his anthemic instrumental.

Cover versions
There is also a Bulgarian version of the single, called "Навсякъде по света". It features Raffi Bohosyan, Angel & Moisey and Krisko. A Spanish version called "Únete al movimiento" was recorded by Mexican group Belanova.
For Switzerland a version featuring Geneva rapper M.A.M. replacing Katy's verses was recorded.

Track listing
Digital download
 "Anywhere in the World" (radio edit) – 3:53

UK digital EP
 "Anywhere in the World" (radio edit) – 3:53
 "Anywhere in the World" (sport-a-pella version) – 3:51
 "Making of Anywhere in the World" – 2:36

Chart performance

Release history

References

2012 singles
Katy B songs
Mark Ronson songs
Olympic theme songs
2012 Summer Olympics
2012 songs
Songs written by Katy B
Songs written by Mark Ronson